None So Vile is the second studio album by Canadian death metal band Cryptopsy, released on 3 July 1996 by Wrong Again Records. The album was later reissued by Displeased Records and Century Media Records. It was re-released on vinyl in 2012 by War on Music.

None So Vile is the first album to feature bassist Eric Langois, and the last to feature vocalist Lord Worm, until his return on 2005's Once Was Not. The art featured on the cover of the album is a painting by Italian Baroque painter Elisabetta Sirani titled Herodias with the Head of John the Baptist.

Reception

Critical reception 
AllMusic gave the album four and a half stars noting its musical complexity. Sputnikmusic gave the album a perfect five star rating stating that the album's highlight tracks are "Phobophile" and "Slit Your Guts".

Accolades

Track listing

Personnel 

Writing, performance and production credits are adapted from the album liner notes.

Cryptopsy 
 Cryptopsy – production
 Lord Wormvocals
 Jon Levasseurguitar
 Eric Langloisbass guitar
 Flo Mounierdrums, backing vocals

Additional musicians 
 Eric Fiset – backing vocals
 Steve Thibault – backing vocals

Production 
 Pierre Rémillard – production, engineering

Visual art 
 Elisabetta Sirani (Herodias with the Head of John the Baptist) – cover art
 Flo Mounier – photography
 Simon Marsden – photography

Samples 
 The Exorcist III – album intro
 Army of Darkness – album outro

References

External links 
 None So Vile at Cryptopsy's official website
 

1996 albums
Cryptopsy albums